Urszulanowice , German Ursulanowitz is a village in the administrative district of Gmina Strzeleczki (Gemeinde Klein Strehlitz), within Krapkowice County, Opole Voivodeship, in Upper Silesia in south-western Poland.

Since 2006 the village, like the entire commune, has been bilingual in German and Polish.

The village has a population of 6 people. It is administered as part of the village of Moszna (Moschen).

References

Urszulanowice